Sergey Khomitsky (born 13 September 1974) is a Belarusian professional boxer who has challenged once for the WBA interim middleweight title in 2015.

Professional career
Khomitsky made his professional debut on 30 January 1999, winning a six-round unanimous decision over Aleksandr Chuvirov, who also debuted. More than four years would pass until Khomitsky next fought, after which he went undefeated for another three years until losing to Khoren Gevor on 7 March 2006; this loss came via twelve-round unanimous decision, with the IBF and WBO Inter-Continental middleweight titles on the line. In the past decade, Khomitsky has continued to fight many middleweight and super-middleweight contenders including Max Bursak, Martin Murray (twice), Lukáš Konečný, Jamie Moore, Ryan Rhodes, Frank Buglioni, Nick Blackwell, Alfonso Blanco, John Ryder, as well as future world champions Gennady Golovkin and Robert Stieglitz.

Professional boxing record

References

External links

Belarusian male boxers
Middleweight boxers
Super-middleweight boxers
Living people
1974 births
People from Kamianets-Podilskyi
Ukrainian male boxers
Sportspeople from Khmelnytskyi Oblast